Happy Times Will Come Soon is a 2016 Italian drama film directed by Alessandro Comodin. It was screened in the International Critics' Week section at the 2016 Cannes Film Festival.

Cast
 Sabrina Seyvecou
 Marinella Cichello
 Marco Giordana
 Luca Bernardi
 Paolo Viano
 Carlo Rigoni
 Erikas Sizonovas

References

External links
 

2016 films
2016 drama films
Italian drama films
2010s Italian-language films
2010s Italian films